Cristóbal Maldonado (12 October 1950 – 20 October 2019) was a Paraguayan footballer. He played in two matches for the Paraguay national football team in 1975. He was also part of Paraguay's squad for the 1975 Copa América tournament.

References

External links
 

1950 births
2019 deaths
Paraguayan footballers
Paraguay international footballers
Sportspeople from Asunción
Association football forwards
Club Libertad footballers
Real Madrid CF players
Paraguayan expatriate footballers
Expatriate footballers in Spain
Paraguayan football managers
Sportivo Luqueño managers
Paraguay women's national football team managers